Thomas Murray (born 14 January 1933) is a Scottish former footballer, who played as a right-winger in both the Scottish and English football leagues.

Career
Murray began his career at Junior level with Dalry Thistle and in 1955 was capped for the Scotland Junior international side. On stepping up to Falkirk in 1956, Murray won the Scottish Cup in his first season with a man of the match performance in the replayed final against Kilmarnock. Falkirk were relegated in 1959 and Murray moved on during the following season to Queen of the South.

He transferred for £3,000 to Leeds United in August 1960. His spell in Yorkshire was hampered by injury plus competition for his place from rising star Billy Bremner. Murray left for Tranmere Rovers in March 1961 with Leeds recouping their fee however he made only 10 league appearances before returning to Queen of the South to finish his career.

References

External links

Living people
1933 births
Scottish footballers
Dalry Thistle F.C. players
Falkirk F.C. players
Queen of the South F.C. players
Leeds United F.C. players
Tranmere Rovers F.C. players
Association football wingers
Scottish Football League players
Scottish Junior Football Association players
English Football League players